March 22  (English: World Water Day) is a 2017 Indian epic periodical film directed by Kodlu RamaKrishna. Produced by NRI entrepreneur, managing director of Acme building materials Inc LLC, Dubai and singer Harish Sherigar in the banner of Acme Movies International.

Starring Arya Vardan, Kiran Raj, Meghashree, and Deepthi Shetty in the lead roles. Anant nag, Ashish Vidyarthi, Sharath Lohitashwa, Ravi Kale, Jai Jagadish, Vinaya Prasad, Padmaja Rao, Sadhu Kokila, YuvaKishor, Srijan Rai, Shantha Acharya, Prashobitha Prabhakar, Chidanand Poojary, Suvarna Sathish Poojary were in the supporting roles. Music by N. J Ravishekar Mayavi and Manikanth Kadri, dialogue by Madhu B.A, cinematography by Mohan M.M, editing by Basavaraj Uras, with choreography by Madan Harini.

The movie carries a message regarding UNITY, LIVING IN COMMUNAL HARMONY, and the sometimes  bad use of religion by some people due to their "EGO"

Cast

 Kiran Raj as Rahul
 Aryavardhan as Salman
 Meghashree as Amrutha 
 Deepthi Shetty as Rukshana
 Anant Nag as geologist 
 Geetha
 Ashish Vidyarthi
 Sharath Lohitashwa as Basavanagowda Patil, a legislator
 Ravi Kale as Chikkmath
 Jai Jagadish as Sanganna
 Vinaya Prasad as Mumtaj
 Padmaja Rao as Ramakka
 Sadhu Kokila as geologist
 YuvaKishor as Siddarth
 Srijan Rai
 Shantha Acharya as Parvathi
 Prashobitha Prabhakar as Rahul's sister
 Chidanand Poojary as 
 Suvarna Sathish Poojary as Shailaja
 Srinivasa Murthy as Mathadheeswara
 Ramesh Bhat
 Ravindranath
 Harish Sherigar as Chief Minister 
 Sharmila Sherigar as minister

Production
Kodlu Ramkrishna's Very own dream script "March 22" which he was planning to do a movie from long back. He went to Harish Sherigar and narrated the story, who agreed to produce after hearing the detailed script. Harish Sherigar corroborated this by saying that the faith he had in Kodlu Ramkrishna, the story and script of the film, and the opportunity of starting his own production company inspired him to produce March 22 Film. After so many preparations the film is launched on 7 November at an 800-year-old heritage residential building located on the outskirts of Belagavi.

Location, language and costume
One of the first members to join the production team was Subhas Kadakol, the art director, Mohan MM (DOP), Associate director K Jagadeesh Reddy with whom Kodlu Ramakrishna set out for extensive location hunt throughout North Karnataka, to find the setting for the fictional town in late 1980. After searching through Bijapur, Bagalkot, Hubli & belgavi districts .  they zeroed in on an ancient village near chachadi located in Belgavi district, where the film was primarily shot.

The script demanded a dry location: an agricultural village where it had not rained in several years. To depict the 1980s, the crew also required a village which lacked electricity, communication and automobiles.

North Kannada which is a dialect of Kannada Language, is primarily from a region in Karnataka. It was chosen to give the feel of the language spoken during that era. However, the language was diluted, and modern viewers can understand it.

Costume designer spent a lot of time researching to lend authenticity to the characters.

Soundtrack 
N. J Ravishekar Rajamaga & Manikanth Kadri has composed the score and original soundtrack for the film. It was released by ZEE Music Co.
"Ganesha Song"
"Water Song"
"Duet Song1"
"Duet Song2"
"Pathos Song"

References

External links

2017 films
2010s Kannada-language films
Indian drama films
Films directed by Kodlu Ramakrishna